Leoncio Alfonso Morán Sánchez (born 18 July 1966) is a Mexican politician from the National Action Party. From 2009 to 2012 he served as Deputy of the LXI Legislature of the Mexican Congress representing Colima, and previously served as the municipal president of Colima City.

References

1966 births
Living people
Politicians from Colima City
Members of the Chamber of Deputies (Mexico)
National Action Party (Mexico) politicians
21st-century Mexican politicians
Panamerican University alumni
Municipal presidents in Colima